Margaret Josephine McDonagh, Baroness McDonagh (born 26 June 1961) is a British Labour Party politician and was General Secretary of the Labour Party from 1998 to 2001. She now works as a management consultant and is recorded as being co-president of the socialist, Labour Party Irish Society.

Career 
McDonagh was part of the New Labour leadership inner-circle for the 1997 general election campaign and was one of the inner-core deciding the official party position on specific issues.

In 1998, McDonagh became Labour's first female general secretary, after serving as deputy general secretary the previous year. She was not always popular with the grassroots and parts of the Parliamentary Party due to her perceived 'control-freakery'. She was considered to have badly mishandled the party's London mayoral candidate selection process, which resulted in Ken Livingstone winning the election as an independent candidate, leaving the official Labour candidate, Frank Dobson, in third place, with subsequent disapproval amongst the party members. McDonagh later apologised for the mayoral electoral loss. Her organisational skills came to the fore however in the delivery of a second landslide victory at the 2001 general election. She was also criticised for accepting, without consultation, a £100,000 donation from Daily Express an adult magazine publisher Richard Desmond, and still counting as party members those in arrears of up to 15 months to delay news of declining membership emerging.

After stepping down from the position of General Secretary following the 2001 general election, McDonagh took a short Harvard University business course and became General Manager of Express Newspapers. She has been a non-executive director of Standard Life, TBI plc and CareCapital Group plc. She is Chair of the Standard Life Charitable Trust.

She was created a life peer on 24 June 2004 taking the title Baroness McDonagh, of Mitcham and of Morden in the London Borough of Merton.

In 2013, Margaret McDonagh was appointed chair of the Smart Meter Central Delivery Body, which then became Smart Energy GB, an independent organisation that aims to inform consumers about smart meters and their national rollout across Great Britain.

Her sister is Siobhain McDonagh, MP for Mitcham and Morden.

References

1961 births
Living people
Labour Party (UK) life peers
Labour Party (UK) officials
Life peeresses created by Elizabeth II
Harvard University alumni